Lyndon William Terracini,  OSI (born 1949), is an Australian operatic baritone and from 2009 to October 2022 artistic director of Opera Australia.

Early life
Terracini was born in 1949, the oldest of four children born to Shirley and Vita Terracini, and grew up in Dee Why, New South Wales. His paternal grandfather, the son of an immigrant from Genoa, converted to Christianity from Judaism and joined the Salvation Army. He grew up in a devout Salvationist family and played multiple instruments in the Salvation Army band, including cornet, flugelhorn, trombone, euphonium and timpani. He later studied music at the University of Sydney.

Career
Terracini's professional operatic debut was in 1976 as Sid in The Australian Opera's production of Albert Herring at the Sydney Opera House. The same year, he sang in the Australian premier of Hans Werner Henze's El Cimarrón, conducted by the composer at the Adelaide Festival. Henze and Terracini later collaborated on several projects in Italy, where Terracini lived for much of the 1980s.

Terracini eventually moved back to Australia and settled in Lismore, New South Wales. In 1993, he was the founding artistic director of the Northern Rivers Performing Arts (NORPA). He was later artistic director of the Queensland Music Festival in 2000 and the Brisbane Festival from 2006 until 2009.

In 2009, Terracini was headhunted to join Opera Australia as artistic director. He initially concentrated on "reliable crowd-pleasers such as La bohème and The Magic Flute" to rebuild the organisation's finances in the wake of the Global Financial Crisis. He later diversified Opera Australia's offerings with "opera on TV, digital opera with LED screens, and opera on the beach and the harbour". In 2012 he launched an ongoing series of outdoor summer operas on Sydney Harbour, sponsored by Haruhisa Handa. Terracini has received some criticism from the local industry for his use of foreign performers. In 2019 the organisation's board extended his contract to 2023. In October 2022 he announced his resignation from Opera Australia.

Personal life
The actress Catherine Terracini is his daughter, and his brother is criminal defence barrister Winston Terracini SC.

Terracini had two daughters from his first marriage, who were born in Palanzo near Lake Como. In January 2014, Swiss soprano Noëmi Nadelmann announced that she and Terracini had resumed a relationship that was interrupted 23 years before and that she would move to Australia. She did, and they married in 2019.

In the 2014 Queen's Birthday Honours List, Terracini was appointed as a Member of the Order of Australia (AM), "for significant service to the performing arts as an opera performer, director and administrator." In 2018 he was appointed Commander of the Order of the Star of Italy by the Italian government.

References

External links

21st-century Australian male opera singers
Operatic baritones
Living people
1949 births
Date of birth missing (living people)
Opera managers
University of Sydney alumni
Australian people of Italian-Jewish descent
Australian Salvationists
Singers from Sydney
Members of the Order of Australia
20th-century Australian male opera singers